Grace Maxine Mickelson  (née Erdahl; May 22, 1926 – November 20, 2018) was an American politician. She served in the South Dakota Senate from 1972 to 1976.

Mickelson died in Rapid City in 2018.

References

1926 births
2018 deaths
People from Rapid City, South Dakota
People from Winnebago County, Iowa
University of Iowa alumni
Women state legislators in Iowa
Democratic Party South Dakota state senators